Prosopidia is a genus of moths in the subfamily Arctiinae.

Species
 Prosopidia caeruleocephala Rothschild, 1912
 Prosopidia meruloides Schaus, 1905
 Prosopidia morosa Schaus, 1910

Former species
 Prosopidia merula Dognin, 1891

References

Natural History Museum Lepidoptera generic names catalog

Arctiinae